Kaimur district is one of the 38 districts of Bihar, India. The district headquarters are at Bhabua. Before 1991, it was part of Rohtas District. Till 1764 the region (Kaimur district) was a part of Ghazipur District and was a part of Kamsaar Raj and later it was a part of Chainpur Estate till 1837.

The district occupies an area of 3363 km² and has a population of 1,626,384 with the rank of 307th in the country. The district has a Literacy rate of 69.34% (392nd in the country).
Kaimur district is a part of Patna division. It is the Western-southern district of Bihar, Western-southern point of Bihar called Chand is situated on the Bhabua–Chandauli road. The district has 18 colleges, 58 high schools, 146 middle schools, and 763 primary schools. The district has a total of 1699 villages. The district also has 120 post offices and 151 panchayat, and is well connected with NH-2(Grand trunk road). Which is accomplished by Bhabhua Road (BBU) railway station it is the main route which connects Sealdah to Mumbai via Gaya junction.

The most spoken languages are Hindi and Bhojpuri. Due to its close proximity to eastern Uttar Pradesh, people here have Purvanchali tinge in their language.

History

Kaimur district was established on 17 March 1991 when it was split off from Rohtas district. It was called Bhabua district until 1994, when it was renamed to its current name.

The earliest evidence of human habitation in the district consists of rock paintings in the Lehda forest that date to around 20,000 years ago. In June 2012, erotic Pala sculptures were excavated in the village of Baidyanath.

It is currently a part of the Red Corridor.
In the other side it is associated with belief of Hindus it is Penitential of Atri (Sanskrit: अत्रि) or Attri Rishi & one of the oldest temple in India of Ma Mundeswari which is the part of attraction of tourism.

Geography
Geographically, the district can be divided into two parts viz. (i) Hilly area and (ii) Plain area. The hilly area is Kaimur plateau (also known as Rohtas plateau). The plain area on the western side is flanked by the rivers Karmanasa and the Durgavati. The Kudra river lies on it eastern side. The district of Buxar of Bihar State and the district of Ghazipur of U.P. State bound it on the North. On the south is the district of Rohtas of Bihar State and on the West is the district of Chandauli and Mirzapur of the U.P. State. On the East is district of Rohtas of Bihar State.

Kaimur district has a large forest cover, measuring roughly  hectares which contains the Kaimur Wildlife Sanctuary, home to tigers, leopards and chinkaras. Waterfalls like Karkat Waterfall and Telhar are present here.

Politics 
  

|}

Economy
Agriculture is the main component of the economy in the district. Rice, wheat, telhan, dalhan and maize are the main crops. Industries located in the district include Vanaspati Oil Ltd., ACC Limited and the Power Grid Corporation of India's high voltage direct current (HVDC) grid station at Pusauli.

In 2006 the named Kaimur one of the country's 250 most backward districts (out of a total of 640). It is one of the 36 districts in Bihar currently receiving funds from the Backward Regions Grant Fund Programme (BRGF).

Divisions
Kaimur district is divided into 11 community development blocks, grouped together into 2 subdivisions, based at Bhabua and Mohania:
Bhabua subdivision
 Adhaura
 Bhabua
 Bhagwanpur
 Chainpur
 Chand
 Rampur
Mohania subdivision
Durgawati
 Kudra
 Mohania
 Ramgarh
 Nuaon

Transport

Road

National Highway 19 (G.T. Road) crosses through Mohania Town, Pusauli and Kudra.

National Highway 319 (India) originates from Mohania and connects with the capital Patna via Arrah. Apart from these, there are also a few state highways in the city. Mohania is connected to Bauxar via Ramgarh from the south and with Bhabua (district capital, Adhaura, Bhagwanpur) from the south. The State Highway 14 connects Bhabua to Mohania.

Bhabua Road Railway Station is (Mohania Town) situated on Gaya–Mughalsarai section of Grand Chord Railway line. Bhabua (the district headquarters) is 14 km southward from the Bhabua Road railway station.

The famous Mundeshawari Devi Temple (the 'oldest functional' temple of world) is about 10 km south to Bhabua and about 25 km south to the railway station. If someone wants to visit the temple then he should arrive at Bhabua Road station first then he may take a direct bus to Mundeshawari Devi temple or may first take bus to Bhabua and then an auto/tempo to the temple.

The nearest airport is Lal Bahadur Shastri International Airport (VNS) (Babatpur, Varanasi).

Demographics

According to the 2011 census Kaimur district has a population of 1,626,384, roughly equal to the nation of Guinea-Bissau or the US state of Idaho. This gives it a ranking of 307th in India (out of a total of 640). Its population growth rate over the decade 2001–2011 was 27.54%. Kaimur has a sex ratio of 919 females for every 1000 males, and a literacy rate of 71.01%. 4.03% of the population lives in urban areas. Scheduled Castes and Scheduled Tribes make up 22.69% and 3.57% of the population respectively.

Languages

At the time of the 2011 Census of India, 90.55% of the population in the district spoke Bhojpuri, 7.11% Hindi and 2.13% Urdu as their first language.

See also
Districts of Bihar
Neha Singh Rathore

References

External links

Official government website
 Kaimur Information Portal

 
Patna division
Districts of Bihar
1991 establishments in Bihar